NJP may refer to:
New Jalpaiguri railway station, India, station code
New Journal of Physics, scientific journal
non-judicial punishment, US armed forces
Nepal Janata Party, a political party in Nepal